Tudulinna (Estonian for "Sleepy Town") is a small borough in Ida-Viru County in Alutaguse Parish in northeastern Estonia. It was the administrative centre of the former Tudulinna Parish. As of 2011 Census, the settlement's population was 220.

References

Boroughs and small boroughs in Estonia
Kreis Wierland